Olavi Heikkinen (born 27 April 1944) is a Finnish sports shooter. He competed in the mixed 25 metre rapid fire pistol event at the 1980 Summer Olympics.

References

External links
 

1944 births
Living people
Finnish male sport shooters
Olympic shooters of Finland
Shooters at the 1980 Summer Olympics
People from Rovaniemi
Sportspeople from Lapland (Finland)